Joseph White (born 28 September 1997 in Townsville) is an Australian professional squash player. As of July 2021, he was ranked number 137 in the world. He won the 2021 Howick Open.

White currently studies a Bachelor of Business (Sport Management) at Deakin University.

References

1997 births
Living people
Australian male squash players
Competitors at the 2022 World Games